George Peter Harlamon (February 5, 1919 – May 14, 2011) was an American municipal politician. A member of the Republican Party, Harlamon served as the mayor of Waterbury, Connecticut, from June 1968 to January 1970. Harlamon is noted for peacefully resolving race riots in Waterbury during the summer of 1969.

Early life
Harlamon was born in Waterbury, Connecticut on February 5, 1919. He served as a sergeant in the U.S. Army in the Philippines during World War II. Afterwards, he received a bachelor in accounting, with honors, from Fordham University and an MBA from  the University of Connecticut.

Career
Harlamon worked initially for the General Accounting Office in Washington D.C. He returned to Waterbury to work for the Chase Brass and Copper Company and, in 1966, became the comptroller for Waterbury National Bank.

In 1968, Harlamon was President of the Board of Aldermen when then mayor Frederick W. Palomba resigned after suffering a heart attack, just six months into his 2nd term. Harlamon assumed the office of mayor on June 1, 1968. During the summer of 1969, Waterbury was beset by race riots. Waterbury's African-American citizens led a fight for civil rights against charges of segregation and racism. With the threat of further violence and rioting, Harlamon, against the advice of city officials, met with the protesters and helped to craft an agreement that ended the riots. Civil rights leaders later cited Harlamon's personal trust and leadership with bringing a peaceful resolution to the conflict.

Several months later Harlamon lost the mayoral election to Edward D. Bergin, who won his fourth non-consecutive term as Mayor of Waterbury. He left office on January 1, 1970.

Harlamon also served on the city's Board of Finance and Board of Park Commissioners. He was President of the Board of Park Commissioners for 9 years. In recognition of his service to the City of Waterbury and his civic involvement as a member of the Board of Directors of the YMCA, Mattatuck Museum, Waterbury Exchange Club and the Waterbury Symphony Orchestra, Harlamon was elected to the  Waterbury Hall of Fame in 2003.

Personal life
Harlamon and his wife, Katherine, had two children, Peter and James. He was an active member of the Greek Orthodox Church.

References

Mayors of Waterbury, Connecticut
American people of Greek descent
1919 births
2011 deaths
Fordham University alumni
United States Army personnel of World War II
University of Connecticut alumni